Debbie Green  was an American folk singer. She was born in New York City in 1940 and grew up on Staten Island. She was one of the first folk performers at the Club 47 Mount Auburn in Cambridge, Massachusetts before moving to Berkeley, California in 1960.

Career background 
Green played the ukulele, guitar, electric bass and piano. (Bob Dylan allegedly described her as  “a great piano player”.)

While a freshman at Boston University, Green taught Joan Baez guitar and Baez has noted her influence as a teacher. Other observers claim that Baez was a Green imitator and turned Green into an apparent Baez imitator. Eric Andersen has said that Green taught both him and Eric Clapton fingerpicking. Allegedly too pretty to be taken seriously, and with her style adopted by others, Green never recorded an album under her own name. She recorded only one song during her heyday, "Who's Going to Be My Man". Motherhood and pulmonary health problems put her singing career on hold.

Personal life 
She married folk musician Eric Andersen and they had a daughter, Sari Andersen Bouret.

Eric Andersen announced on his Facebook page that she died December 9, 2017.

References

Living people
Boston University alumni
The Putney School alumni
1940 births